Asakura Dam  is an earthfill dam located in Ehime Prefecture in Japan. The dam is used for irrigation. The catchment area of the dam is 7.7 km2. The dam impounds about 9  ha of land when full and can store 1400 thousand cubic meters of water. The construction of the dam was started on 1972 and completed in 1981.

References

Dams in Ehime Prefecture
1981 establishments in Japan